Brian James O'Keefe (born July 15, 1993) is an American professional baseball catcher in the Seattle Mariners organization. He was drafted by the St. Louis Cardinals in the 7th round of the 2014 Major League Baseball draft. He made his MLB debut in 2022 for the Seattle Mariners.

Career

Amateur career
O'Keefe attended South Colonie High School in Albany, New York, and Saint Joseph's University, where played college baseball at Saint Joseph's Hawks. In 2014, his junior year at Saint Joseph's, he hit .350/.423/.519 with seven home runs and 43 RBIs over 50 games.

St. Louis Cardinals
After the season, he was drafted by the St. Louis Cardinals in the seventh round of the 2014 Major League Baseball draft. O'Keefe made his professional debut with the Low-A State College Spikes, batting .239 with three home runs and 17 RBIs in 47 games. He split the 2015 season between State College and the Single-A Peoria Chiefs, accumulating a .241/.311/.397 slash in 47 games. In 2016, O'Keefe played for Peoria and the High-A Palm Beach Cardinals, clubbing 13 home runs and 64 RBI to go along with a .252/.361/.436 triple slash. O'Keefe split the 2017 campaign between Peoria, Palm Beach, and the Double-A Springfield Cardinals, hitting .262/.320/.433 with a career-high 15 home runs and 48 RBI in 101 games between the three affiliates. He returned to Palm Beach for a third season in 2018, batting .243/.358/.412 with 6 home runs and 44 RBI in 73 contests. In 2019, O'Keefe spent the year with Springfield, slashing .229/.319/.389 with 13 home runs and 40 RBI in 88 games.

Seattle Mariners
On December 12, 2019, O'Keefe was selected by the Seattle Mariners in the minor league phase of the Rule 5 draft after spending six years in the Cardinals' minor league system. O'Keefe did not play in a game in 2020 due to the cancellation of the minor league season because of the COVID-19 pandemic. He spent the 2021 campaign split between the Double-A Arkansas Travelers and the Triple-A Tacoma Rainiers, logging a slash of .269/.349/.485 while posting career-highs in home runs (24) and RBI (70) in 105 combined games. He elected minor league free agency following the season on November 7, 2021.

On December 3, 2021, O'Keefe re-signed with the Mariners organization on a minor league contract and received an invitation to Spring Training. He did not make the club out of spring and was assigned to Triple-A Tacoma to begin the 2022 season. The Mariners promoted O'Keefe to the major leagues on September 30.

On September 30, 2022, O'Keefe was selected to the 40-man roster and promoted to the major leagues for the first time. On October 1, 2022, O'Keefe hit his first Major League hit off Oakland Athletics pitcher JP Sears. On November 18, 2022, O'Keefe was non tendered and became a free agent. On January 3, 2023, O'Keefe re-signed a minor league deal.

See also
Rule 5 draft results

References

External links

Living people
1993 births
Baseball players from New York (state)
Sportspeople from Albany, New York
Major League Baseball catchers
Seattle Mariners players
Saint Joseph's Hawks baseball players
Saratoga Brigade players
State College Spikes players
Peoria Chiefs players
Palm Beach Cardinals players
Springfield Cardinals players
Arkansas Travelers players
Tacoma Rainiers players